The 2004–05 Duleep Trophy was the 44th season of the Duleep Trophy, a first-class cricket tournament contested by five zonal teams of India: Central Zone, East Zone, North Zone, South Zone and West Zone. In addition to these five teams, a guest team (Bangladesh Cricket Board XI) also featured in the tournament.

Central Zone won the title, defeating North Zone in the final.

Results

Group stage
Group A points table

Group B points table

Source:

Final

References

External links
Series home at CricketArchive

Duleep Trophy seasons
Duleep Trophy
Duleep Trophy